is a Japanese actress who is represented by the talent agencies, Amuse inc, and later W-Up.

Filmography

TV series

Films

References

External links
  

21st-century Japanese actresses
1991 births
Living people
People from Kobe